Sweet and spicy is something that tastes sweet and that tastes spicy (piquant, hot, peppery)

Sweet and spicy or variation may refer to:

 "Sweet & Spicy", a flavor of Good Earth Tea
 "Sweet and Spice", a flavor of Tabasco sauce

See also
 Sweet (disambiguation)
 Spice (disambiguation)
 Sweet and sour
 Hot and sour
 Sweet sour and spicy vegetable gravy